Ko Sung-hee (born June 21, 1990) is a South Korean actress. She played her first leading role in the fantasy-period drama Diary of a Night Watchman (2014).

Personal life 
On October 17, 2022, Ko's agency announced that Ko is getting married with a non-celebrity boyfriend in November. They married in a private ceremony on November 20, 2022 in Seoul.

Filmography

Film

Television series

Web series

Television show

Awards and nominations

References

External links

 
 
 

1990 births
Living people
21st-century South Korean actresses
South Korean television actresses
South Korean film actresses
Sungkyunkwan University alumni